Georgetown Review was an annual literary magazine produced at Georgetown College in Georgetown, Kentucky.

History and profile
Georgetown Review was first published in 1993 and hosted a prestigious annual prose contest.  The magazine was published annually. It had the largest circulation of any literary magazine published in Kentucky.

Past contributors included Doug Ramspeck, Sam Witt, Frederick Barthelme, Fred Chappell, Denise Duhamel, David Allan Evans, Jacob M. Appel, Mark Halperin, X.J. Kennedy, David Romtvedt, Carla Panciera, Ernest Hilbert, Maraget Hoehn, Gregory Loselle, Shannon Sweetnam, Paula Younger and Emma Bolden.

The magazine's website announced in an undated notice that the Spring 2015 issue will be the last for the journal, although the related press would continue to publish and conduct contests.

Masthead
As of March 2009:
Editor: Steven Carter
Poetry Editors:  Emma Bolden, Stacy Cartledge
Assistant Editor: Jacob Price
Art Director: W.T. Pfefferle

See also
List of literary magazines

References

External links
Georgetown Review website

1993 establishments in Kentucky
2015 disestablishments in Kentucky
Annual magazines published in the United States
Defunct literary magazines published in the United States
Magazines established in 1993
Magazines disestablished in 2015
Magazines published in Kentucky
Poetry magazines published in the United States
Defunct mass media in Kentucky
Review